Ethel John Lindgren (1 January 1905 – 23 March 1988) was an American-born British ethnologist and anthropologist who studied the customs of nomadic herders and shamanism in Manchuria apart from folkloristic studies. She was a major influence on a generation of English field anthropologists through her teaching at Cambridge University.

Biography 
Born in Evanston, Illinois her father was a Swedish-origin banker in Chicago who died when she was young. Her mother, the pianist Ethel Roe Lindgren, then married the composer Henry Eichheim in 1917. The family travelled around the world.  While still a child, on a trip to see the Great Wall of China, she decided that her interest was in the exploration of the Mongolian region. She was educated at Smith College, followed by Newnham College, Cambridge where she studied Chinese, and psychology.

In 1927 she travelled to Urga (now Ulan Bator) and made later trips to Manchuria and studied nomadic Tungus. She was able to record shaman practices in the region, assisted by her first husband, Oscar Mamen. By 1934, Lindgren began to investigate reindeer nomadism in the Swedish Lapland. She would later publish several works on the Reindeer Tungus of Manchuria, which included her doctoral dissertation on the subject. Lindgren conducted research in Siberia and was the first person to collect materials on the Polish anthropologist Maria Czaplicka and her research on the region. She authored three articles on the cultural contact between Evenks and Russian Cossacks. Part of her work on the Evenks was a photograph she captured in 1931 of the disk-shaped device called indaan, which is believed to be a simple model of the world used by reindeer herders. It also included her account of the Three-River Delta (TRD) Russians, which she said experienced periods of cultural and economic domination in their area of inhabitancy.

She continued to work in Cambridge University and worked as a lecturer in the faculty of archaeology and anthropology. Having identified with the British cause during the Second World War, she became a naturalized British citizen in 1940. After the war she married her second husband Mikel Utsi, a Saami reindeer breeder. They were involved in introducing reindeer into the Scottish Highlands around 1949.

Publications 

 North-Western Manchuria and the Reindeer-Tungus (1930)
 Field work in social psychology (1935)
 The shaman dress of the Dagurs, Solons and Numinchens in NW Manchuria (1935)
 An Example of Culture Contact without Conflict: Reindeer Tungus and Cossacks of Northwestern Manchuria (1938)

References 

1905 births
1988 deaths
British ethnologists
Women ethnologists
British anthropologists
British women anthropologists
Alumni of the University of Cambridge
20th-century anthropologists
American emigrants to the United Kingdom